Paget Parish is one of the nine parishes of Bermuda.

Paget, Bermuda may also refer to:
 Paget Marsh Nature Reserve in Paget Parish, Bermuda
 Paget Island in St. George's Parish, Bermuda